Wangcun is a township in Jingle County in northwestern province Shanxi province, located  west of the county seat. , it has 35 villages under its administration.

See also 
 List of township-level divisions of Shanxi

References 

Township-level divisions of Shanxi